Blackstone is a Canadian television series which aired on APTN and Showcase. Written, created, directed and produced by Canadian producer Ron E. Scott, the series began filming its first season in 2010 in and around Edmonton, Alberta.

The series has gone on to have four full seasons. Season five started production in spring of 2015 and premiered November 3, 2015. Season 5 was the final season.

In 2015, Prairie Dog Film + Television announced a deal which will see the first and second seasons of the series given a second run on CBC Television as a summer series, as well as making it available for download from iTunes.

Premise
Blackstone follows the lives of Indigenous people living on the fictional Blackstone First Nations reserve, set in Alberta, Canada. The story is told from an Indigenous Canadian point of view. The show addresses important issues that Canadian aboriginals face such as racism, suicide, rape, addiction, alcoholism, drugs, water pollution, education, physical abuse, sexual abuse, child abuse, domestic violence, corruption, politics, crime, missing and murdered aboriginal women, and foster care.

Series regulars
 Carmen Moore as Leona Stoney
 Eric Schweig as Andy Fraser
 Michelle Thrush as Gail Stoney
 Roseanne Supernault as Natalie Stoney (Seasons 1-2) (Recurring Season 4)
 Nathaniel Arcand as Victor Merasty (Seasons 1-4) (Guest Season 5)
 Gordon Tootoosis as Cecil Delaronde (regular-season 1)
 Steven Cree Molison as Daryl Fraser (Regular Seasons 2-5) (Recurring Season 1)
 Andrea Menard as Deborah "Deb"/"Debbie" Fraser (Recurring Seasons 1 and 4) (Regular Seasons 2-3) (Guest Season 5)
 Justin Rain as Alan Fraser (Recurring Season 1) (regular-season 2-5) 
 Ashley Callingbull as Sheila Delaronde (Recurring Season 1 and 5) (Regular Seasons 2-3) 
 Gary Farmer as Ray Delaronde (regular-season 2)
 Tantoo Cardinal as Wilma Stoney (Recurring Season 2) (Regular Seasons 3-5) 
 Trevor Duplessis as Greg Nepoose (Recurring Seasons 1-2) (Regular 3-5)
 Cheri Maracle as Sarah Bull (Recurring Season 3) (Regular Seasons 4-5)
 Bernard Starlight as David "Jumbo" Tailfeathers (Recurring Seasons 1-3) (Regular 4-5)
 Glen Gould as Smokey Stoney (Recurring Season 4) (regular-season 5)

Full cast
Amenakew family:
 Cody Bird as Josh Amenakew
 Tommy J. Mueller as Rick Amenakew

Bull family:
 Cheri Maracle as Sarah Bull
 Georgina Lightning as Tracy Bull
 Miika Bryce Whiskeyjack as Wendy Bull

Delaronde family:
 Ashley Callingbull as Sheila Delaronde
 Gordon Tootoosis as Cecil Delaronde
 Gary Farmer as Ray Delaronde

Fraser family:
 Justin Rain as Alan Fraser
 Eric Schweig as Andy Fraser
 Steven Cree Molison as Daryl Fraser
 Andrea Menard as Deborah "Deb" or "Debbie" Fraser
 Ray G. Thunderchild as Tom Fraser

Henry family:
 Jaren Brandt Bartlett as Alex Henry
 Swo Wo Gabriel as Tim Henry (Alex's brother)
 Stanley Isadore as Phil Henry (Alex and Tim's uncle)

Merasty family:
 Nathaniel Arcand as Victor Merasty
 Quelemia Sparrow (season 1) / Michelle Latimer (season 2) as Gloria Merasty
 Sydney Miles as Victoria Merasty

Stoney family:
 Michelle Thrush as Gail Stoney
 Carmen Moore as Leona Stoney
 Roseanne Supernault as Natalie Stoney
 Tantoo Cardinal as Wilma Stoney
 Glen Gould as Smokey Stoney

Tailfeathers family:
 Bernard Starlight as David "Jumbo" Tailfeathers
 Julian Black Antelope as Darrien Tailfeathers

Social Workers: 
 Valerie Planche as Marilyn Cole
 Hiro Kanagawa as Harold

Police:
 Mathew Strongeagle as Stu Nolan
 Vincent Gale as Detective Deacon
 Garry Chalk as Deputy Chief Ken Hillis
 John Cassini as Detective Platt
 Lori Triolo as Detective Hutch

Lawyer:
 Ryan Cunningham as Darcy Douglas (Andy Fraser's Lawyer)

Doctors:
 Cameron Bancroft as Dr. Kurt Ellis
 Jennifer Podemski as Dr. Crowshoe

Other major characters:
 Mark Anderako as Walter "Walt" Andrachuck
 Warren Michael as Leonard "Leo" Morin
 Morningstar Mercredi as Norma DeLorme
 Trevor Duplessis as Greg Nepoose (close friend to the Stoney family, Gail's on/off boyfriend)
 Teneil Whiskyjack as Kyra Amos
 Star Birdyellowhead as Carla Janvier
 Amanda McLeod as Chrystal
 Greg Lawson as Teddy Burton
 Jim Thorburn as Chris Connor (Leona's ex-boyfriend)
 Lee Tomaschefski as Angel
 Darrell Dennis as Clyde Bearspaw
 Jessica Matten as Gina (Daryl's girlfriend)
 Christopher Rosamond as Jack

Notable guest stars
 Brett Dier as Jake (Season 2, Episode 6: Forgiveness)
 Mark Meer as Policeman (Season 5, Episode 2: Super Dad)
 MacKenzie Porter as Brianne

Episodes

Season 1 (2011)

Season 2 (2012)

Season 3 (2013)

Season 4 (2014)

Season 5 (2015)

See also 

 Redfern Now an Australian television series with a similar theme.

Accolades

References

External links
 Official website
 APTN page

2010s Canadian drama television series
2011 Canadian television series debuts
2015 Canadian television series endings
Aboriginal Peoples Television Network original programming
CBC Television original programming
Television shows filmed in Edmonton
Showcase (Canadian TV channel) original programming
Television shows set in Alberta
First Nations television series